Corymbia watsoniana, commonly known as the large-fruited yellowjacket, is a species of tree that is endemic to Queensland. It has rough, tessellated bark on the trunk and branches, egg-shaped to broadly lance-shaped adult leaves, flower buds in groups of seven, creamy white flowers and barrel-shaped or urn-shaped fruit.

Description
It has rough, flaky to tessellated yellowish to brownish bark on the trunk and branches. The operculum is much wider than the floral cup. Flowering has been observed in June and the flowers are creamy white.

Taxonomy
The large-fruited yellowjacket was first formally described in 1877 by Ferdinand von Mueller who gave it the name Eucalyptus watsonianain his book Fragmenta Phytographiae Australiae. The specific epithet honours "Th. Wentworth Watson" who collected the type specimens near Wigton. In 1995, Ken Hill and Lawrie Johnson changed the name to Corymbia watsoniana, publishing the change in the journal Telopea.

In the same paper, Hill and Johnson described two subspecies and the names have been accepted by the Australian Plant Census:
 Corymbia watsoniana subsp. capillata (Brooker & A.R.Bean) K.D.Hill & L.A.S.Johnson has bristly late juvenile and intermediate leaves with the petiole attached to the underside of the leaf blade;
 Corymbia watsoniana (F.Muell.) K.D.Hill & L.A.S.Johnson subsp. watsoniana has late juvenile and intermediate leaves with the leaf blade tapering to the petiole.

Distribution and habitat
This eucalypt grows in forest, mainly on flat areas with sandy soil. It is found between Springsure, Rolleston, Eidsvold, Gayndah and the Barakula State Forest.

See also
 List of Corymbia species

References

watsoniana
Myrtales of Australia
Flora of Queensland
Plants described in 1877
Taxa named by Ferdinand von Mueller